The Chicago and North Western Roundhouse in Huron, South Dakota was listed on the National Register of Historic Places in 1998.  The listing included two contributing buildings and a contributing structure of the Chicago & North Western Railroad.  It has also been known as C&NW Roundhouse and as Huron Roundhouse.

The roundhouse was built around 1907, with brick laid in common bond. An office and storage building also from the same time, is a single-story building.

See also
Dakota, Minnesota and Eastern Railroad
Rapid City, Pierre and Eastern Railroad

References

External links

Railway roundhouses on the National Register of Historic Places
Railroad roundhouses in South Dakota
National Register of Historic Places in Beadle County, South Dakota
Buildings and structures completed in 1907